Sebastiania rupicola is a species of flowering plant in the family Euphorbiaceae. It was described in 1912. It is native to Rio de Janeiro, Brazil.

References

Plants described in 1912
Flora of Brazil
rupicola